The 2022–23 Western Carolina Catamounts men's basketball team represented Western Carolina University in the 2022–23 NCAA Division I men's basketball season. The Catamounts, led by second-year head coach Justin Gray, played their home games at the Ramsey Center in Cullowhee, North Carolina, as members of the Southern Conference.

Previous season
The Catamounts finished the 2021–22 season 11–21, 5–13 in SoCon play to finish in last place. In the SoCon tournament, they were defeated by Mercer in the first round.

Roster

Schedule and results

|-
!colspan=12 style=| Non-conference regular season

|-
!colspan=12 style=| SoCon regular season

|-
!colspan=12 style=| SoCon tournament
|-

|-
!colspan=12 style=| College Basketball Invitational

|-

Sources

References

Western Carolina Catamounts men's basketball seasons
Western Carolina Catamounts
Western Carolina Catamounts men's basketball
Western Carolina Catamounts men's basketball
Western Carolina